A Constitutional History of the United States is a book by Andrew C. McLaughlin. It won the 1936 Pulitzer Prize for History.

References 

Pulitzer Prize for History-winning works